John T. Sinnott (born May 16, 1948) is a physician, scientist, and business executive who is the Chairman of Internal Medicine at the University of South Florida (USF) Morsani College of Medicine.

Dr. Sinnott serves as chairman of the Department of Internal Medicine at the Morsani College of Medicine at the University of South Florida, the medical school's largest department. Sinnott is also the James P. Cullison Professor of Medicine as well. Sinnott has served as the director of the Florida Infectious Disease Institute since 2004 and is the former Associate Dean of USF Medicine International, which he founded with Dr. Lynette Menezes.

Sinnott studied the importance of Levamisole-induced vasculitis.

Biography
Sinnott graduated from Columbus College in Georgia in 1971 and received a Master of Science degree from the University of South Florida in 1973 in microbiology.  He was awarded an MD degree from University of South Alabama in 1978. Sinnott completed his postdoctoral training at the University of South Florida. He completed an internal medicine residency and infectious diseases and tropical medicine fellowship in 1983 at the University of South Florida under Dr. Charles Craig.

In 1983, Sinnott was named director of clinical research in the University of South Florida Infectious Diseases and Tropical Medicine Division. He served as an assistant professor in internal medicine at USF from 1983 to 1989 and was an adjunct professor at USF in the orthopedics department from 1984 to 1990. Sinnott was named the infectious disease coordinator at Tampa General Hospital and University of South Florida College of Medicine in 1985.

In 1991 Sinnott was named director of the Division of Infectious Disease and International Medicine at USF College of Medicine. In 2005, Sinnott was named Associate Dean of USF Medicine International and held that position until 2013. In 2013 he was selected Chairman of the Department of Internal Medicine at Morsani College of Medicine. While also serving as the Associate Dean of USF Medicine International, Sinnott also served as a Global Health Professor from 2005 to 2012. From 2005 to 2010, Sinnott also served as Co-Director of the Interdisciplinary Program in Allergy, Immunology, and Infectious Disease.

While director of the Infectious Disease Dr. Sinnott started the USF Florida Institute for Infectious Disease which helped the state spearhead a biodefense education program while building a nationally recognized infectious disease fellowship.  In 2001 he was appointed as the Senior Advisor for Biodefense to Florida Secretary of Health Dr. John Agwunobi. In 2006, Sinnott served on Governor Charlie Crist's Transition Team, advising on health care.

In 2012 Sinnott was selected to be chairman of the Department of Internal Medicine at the Morsani College of Medicine at USF. In 2016 he helped arrange the Sister Cities Agreement between Tampa, FL and Lanzhou, China.  Tampa mayor Bob Buckhorn and his Sister City representative traveled with Sinnott to Lanzhou, China, to sign this agreement, which is Tampa's first Sister City in Asia.

In 2003, Sinnott was elected as chairman of the board for Food Tech, VIFL (NASDAQ). He oversaw an expansion in business when he focused the company on medical device sterilization.  He also oversaw the sale of the company to Sterigenics.  Sinnott also served as a Trustee on the Board of the USF Foundation from 2008 to 2020 and the Florida Health Science Center (Tampa General Hospital) Board of Directors from 2008 to 2018.

Since 1985, Sinnott has served as the director of Epidemiology and Employee Health at Tampa General Hospital. He has also served as an Epidemiologist for Shriner's Children Hospital since 1987.

Publications

 Shapshak P, Pandjassarame K, Fujimura RK, Commins D, Chiappelli F, Singer E, Levine A, Minagar A, Novembre F, Somboonwit C, Nath A, Sinnott JT. NeuroAIDS Review. Editorial. AIDS 2011; 25:123-141.
 
 Billington A, Sinnott JT. [Book Review] The Great Influenza. Infect in Med 2005; 22(8):375
 Wills TS, Lavina J, Sinnott JT. Blastoschizomyces capitatus pneumonia in an immunocompetent male. South Med J 2004 Jul; 97(7):702-4
 Gill JK, Field T, Vincent AL, Greene JN, Sandin RL, Sinnott JT. Antibiotic susceptibility among penicillin-resistant pneumococcal isolates in cancer patients. Infect in Med 2003; 20:9
 Vincent AL, Sinnott JT. Apparent per capita consumption of cigarettes by Florida counties. Fl J of Public Health 2003; 13:1
 Sinnott JT, Degryse A. Death and dying [Book Review]. JAMA 2003; 289(2):235-236
 Ganguly R, Lenox B, Quiroz E, Sinnott JT. HIV infection, risk factors, and testing in a veteran population. Amer Clin Lab 2002 Mar; 21(2):32-9 
 Montero, JA, Zaulyanov, LL, Houston, S. H, Sinnott, JT. Chancroid: an update. Infect in Med 2002; 19:4
 Montero JA, Herman B, Bartels LJ, Sinnott JT. Tuberculous otitis. Infect in Med 2002; 19:2
 Rosenbach KA, Sinnott JT. Vaccines in the 21st Century. Infect in Med 2001; 18:8
 
 
 Larkin JA, Lit L, Sinnott JT, Wills T. Infection of a knee prosthesis with Tsukamurella species. A case report. South Med J 1999; 92:831-2
 Larkin JA, Minerva K, Sinnott JT. HIV primer [Book Review]. JAMA 1999; 281:24
 Cottam JA, Shenefelt PD, Sinnott JT, Stevens GL, Cancio M, Sakalosky PE. Common skin infections in the elderly. Infect in Med 1999; 16:4
 Mastorides SM, Oehler RL, Greene JN, Sinnott JT, Kranik M, Sandin RL. The detection of airborne mycobacterium tuberculosis using micropore membrane air sampling and polymerase chain reaction. Chest 1999 Jan; 115(1):19-25 
 Sinnott JT, Kneer C, Holt D, Ganguly R. Exposure of medical students to body fluids. J of Am Coll Health 1999 Mar; 47(5):207-10
 Lynch CM, Sinnott JT, Shashy, RG, Murphy SJ. Acute fatty liver of pregnancy: a confusing clinical entity. Hospital Phys 1999
 Sarria JC, Sinnott JT, Martin DH. An AIDS patient with fever and a cough. Infect In Med 1998; 15:1
 Larkin JA, Ubillos SS, Sinnott JT, Houston SH. Infection prophylaxis after occupational exposure to HIV: a simple approach. The AIDS Read 1998; 8:3
 Ormerod LD, Sinnott JT, et al. Rapidly progressive herpetic retinal necrosis: a blinding complication of advanced AIDS. Clin Infect Dis 1998 Jan; 26(1):34-35
 Schwandt R, Callahan C, Greene JN, Sinnott JT, D’Agostino A, Sandin RL. Actinomycosis mimicking metastatic lung cancer. Infect in Med 1997; (14)10: 791-98
 Lynch CM, Pinelli DM, Cruse CW, Spellacy WN, Sinnott, JT, Shashey RG. Maternal death from postpartum necrotizing

Honors, decorations, awards and distinctions

 Honorary Medical Staff Officer, 2001 
 Tree of Life Award, 1996 
 Founding Physician Award, Protective Care Unit, 1989 
 President's Circle of Excellence, 1987–1988 
 ECSS Award for Educational Excellence, Office of Education, 2011–2012 
 Inspire by Example Award, USF Student Affairs, 2011 
 Dean's Academic Performance Award, 2008–2009 
 Charter Class Mentor, USF Health Leadership Institute, 2006 – present 
 Faculty, Alpha Omega Alpha, 1989 – present 
 Silver Performance Award for Outstanding Contributions, College of Medicine, Department of Internal Medicine, 2006–2007 
 Gold Circle Honoree, 2004 
 Honors and Awards Council, 1999–2002 
 Charge to the Graduating Class, College of Medicine, 2001 
 Charge to the Graduating Class, College of Medicine, 2000 
 Honorary Alumnus, Alumnae Association, 1998 
 Provost's Award, Faculty-Staff Scholarship Campaign, 1997 
 Lifetime Appreciation Award, Division of Infectious Diseases, 1996 
 Outstanding Service Award, Division of Infectious Disease, 1992 
 Most Outstanding Clinical Professor, 1987, 1988, 1989, 1990, 1991, 1992 (Award retired and renamed "John T. Sinnott Award for Outstanding Clinical Professor," 1992) 
 Faculty Sponsor, Watson Clinic Award for Outstanding Senior Student Research, 1989, 1991, 1992 
 Fund-Raising Recognition Award, Faculty Staff Scholarship Campaign, 1990 
 2nd Place Award, Faculty Sponsor, Student Research Day, 1990 
 Founding Physician Award, Moffitt Cancer Center Institute, 1986 
 Outstanding House Officer Award, 1978 
 Phi Sigma Honor Society, Tampa, Florida, 1973 
 Patients’ Choice Award, 2012 
 Certificate of Appreciation for “Care of military veterans and education of physicians and colleagues from 2000 to 2012”, James A. Haley Veterans Hospital, 2012 
 Health Care Educator Award, Tampa Bay Business Journal's Health Care Heroes, 2011 
 Citation: Elected by Peers for Inclusion in Best Doctors in America, 1996–2004 and 2007–2012 
 Citation: Leon G. Smith Infectious Disease Institute Hall Of Fame, 2000 – present 
 Citation: Naifeh S and Smith GW. The Best Doctors in America, 2001–present 
 Citation: Who's Who in America and Science and Engineering, 1997 – present 
 Citation: International Who's Who for Professionals, 1996 – present 
 Finalist, Physician Mentor Recognition Program, American Medical Association – Women Physicians Congress, 2007 
 Leadership Florida Distinguished Member Award, Tampa, Florida, 2007 
 Service Awards, Department of Homeland Security and Immigration Enforcement “In Recognition of ICE Training.” Presented by Phil Ashton, Immigration Customs Enforcement, Lantana, Florida, 2007 
 Lifetime Achievement Award, The AIDS Institute, for “Longtime Dedication to HIV/AIDS Prevention, Treatment, and Research in the United States and Internationally,” Tampa, 2006 
 Julia B. Williams Award for Service to Hillsborough County Community College Foundation, 2005 
 Because We Care Award, Florida Liver Association, Tampa, Florida, 2004 
 Leadership Florida Class XXI Graduate, 2003 
 Florida HIV/AIDS Red Ribbon Excellence Award, Bureau of HIV/AIDS, Florida AIDS Action, 2003 
 Citation: Best Doctors in Tampa, chosen by Doctors, Tampa Bay Magazine, February 2001, 2003 
 Finalist, Humanism in Medicine Award, Association of American Medical Colleges, 2001 
 Citation: Strathmore's Who's Who, 2001 
 Citation: Lexington Who's Who, 2000 
 National Beth Israel Humanism Award, NBI Healthcare Foundation, 1998 
 AIDS Education Award for Dedication and Support of AIDS Education, 1997 
 AIDS Service Award, FACT (For AIDS Care Today) St. Petersburg, Florida, 1997 
 Leadership in Medical Education Award, Florida Medical Association, Jacksonville, Florida, 1994

References



1948 births
University of South Florida faculty
Living people